Mail banking is a service provided by a financial institution which allows its customers to deposit cheques into their account by mail. It is primarily used by virtual banks (as they may not offer branches or ATMs that accept deposits) and by customers who live too far from a branch. Typically, the institution that advertises such a service will provide its own business reply mail envelopes as a courtesy.

See also
Telephone banking
Offshore Bank Accounts & EMI Accounts
Online banking

Banking